Social Sciences, Humanities and the Arts for People and the Economy (SHAPE,) is a joint initiative, developed in 2020, by LSE, the British Academy, the Academy of Social Sciences and Arts Council England, to provide a new collective name for the academic disciplines of social science, humanities and the Arts. SHAPE describes these academic disciplines, which focus on human behaviour, as those which ‘help us understand ourselves, others and the human world around us’.

SHAPE has 3 main aims: to explain what these academic disciplines are and what they do, to illustrate their value and relevance, and to encourage people to study them and use the knowledge and skills gained throughout their careers.

This re-brand of what has traditionally been drawn together under the acronym HASS highlights the importance of SHAPE subjects, and the skills they teach in observation, interpretation, reasoning and analysis, in developing transformative solutions to societal challenges in areas such as health, inequality, the environment and the economy. By promoting these subjects under a new acronym the SHAPE initiative seeks to create parity with STEM subjects, ‘not in opposition, but as equals and collaborators’ in building a better future.

References

Educational organisations based in England
Arts organisations based in England